Terry Ewasiuk (born October 26, 1953) is a Canadian former professional ice hockey player. He was selected by the Pittsburgh Penguins in the 7th round (103rd overall) of the 1973 NHL Amateur Draft, and was also drafted by the Chicago Cougars in the 4th round (40th overall) of the 1973 WHA Amateur Draft. Ewasiuk is currently the head coach for the Saddle Lake Warriors of the North Eastern Alberta Junior B Hockey League.

Playing career
Ewasiuk began his professional career with the Hershey Bears, playing the 1973–74 and 1974–75 seasons with the American Hockey League (AHL) team. He split the 1975–76 season between the Saginaw Gears of the International Hockey League (IHL), and the Baltimore Clippers and Springfield Indians of the AHL. Ewasiuk skated the next two seasons with the Fort Wayne Komets of the IHL before retiring as a player following the 1977–78 campaign.

Coaching career
Ewasiuk served three years as head coach in the Alberta Junior Hockey League (AJHL) with the Fort Saskatchewan Traders and the Sherwood Park Crusaders before becoming head coach of the Grant MacEwan College men's ice hockey team. In the college ranks, Ewasiuk spent six seasons as head coach with the Grant MacEwan Griffins and seven as the head coach of the Portage College Voyageurs. On September 3, 2013, Ewasiuk was brought in as the head coach of the Saddle Lake Warriors in the North Eastern Alberta Junior B Hockey League.

Personal
His son Jay (born August 2, 1980) was drafted by the Moose Jaw Warriors in the 3rd round (45th overall) 1995 WHL Bantam Draft.

References

External links

1953 births
Living people
Baltimore Clippers players
Canadian ice hockey coaches
Canadian ice hockey left wingers
Chicago Cougars draft picks
Edmonton Movers players
Fort Wayne Komets players
Hershey Bears players
Ice hockey people from Alberta
Pittsburgh Penguins draft picks
Saginaw Gears players
Springfield Indians players
Victoria Cougars (WHL) players
People from Smoky Lake County